Sentai Filmworks, LLC (or simply Sentai), is an American entertainment company owned by AMC Networks. Located in Houston, the company specializes in the dubbing and distribution of Japanese animation and Asian cinema. Its post-production arm is Sentai Studios.

The company has its origins in A.D. Vision, which was founded in 1992 by video game fan John Ledford and Matt Greenfield. ADV collapsed due to low sales and eventually liquidated their assets in 2009. Ledford founded Sentai in 2008 and acquired the majority of ADV's titles. Sentai was then acquired by New York City-based AMC Networks in 2022 and became its subsidiary. Its offices are in the International District in Southwest Houston.

History

Origins

In 1990, John Ledford, a native of Houston, started a Japanese video game and video console import business. He was introduced to anime when he watched My Neighbor Totoro at his friend's suggestion. His friend, Matt Greenfield, born in Sacramento, California, ran a local anime club called Anime NASA. Both men established A.D. Vision, which officially opened for business on August 17, 1992. Ledford contacted Toho about optioning the rights to license Devil Hunter Yohko, which became the first title to be released by ADV.

Ledford establishes Sentai
In June 2006, the Japanese Sojitz Corporation acquired a 20% stake in ADV Films. This was done as a means for ADV Films to acquire more titles in the Japanese market. From this point on, virtually all titles that ADV acquired were with Sojitz's help. The following year, Sojitz announced that Japan Content Investments (JCI), Development Bank of Japan, and film distribution company KlockWorx, planned to contribute money to ADV, in return for equity in the company. Ledford was to remain the majority shareholder and CEO. JCI subsidiary ARM also planned to contribute money for ADV to use in acquiring new distribution licenses. The investment was to ADV Films to raise its output of new anime titles, which had dropped in 2006, back to previous levels or above. In return, ADV planned to assist Sojitz with the acquisition of North American and European content for importation into Japan. According to ADV, they also reportedly had "big plans" for its manga line.

However, in January 2008, ADV mysteriously removed a large number of titles from their website. Among the titles which were subsequently removed was Gurren Lagann, which had test disks sent out with dubbed episodes. As a result, ADV sued ARM Corporation and its parent Sojitz for a breach in a contract made previously. In the suit, the exact amount ADV paid to license twenty-nine titles was disclosed. The lawsuit was withdrawn and no ruling was made. That July, Funimation announced the acquisition of thirty of these titles licensed by Sojitz from ADV.

Ledford established Sentai Filmworks in October 2008. Among its first titles to be released were Clannad, Princess Resurrection, Indian Summer, Appleseed and Mahoromatic (formerly licensed by Geneon). On September 1, 2009, ADV had closed its doors and sold off its assets, which included transferring distribution rights to Section23 Films.

On July 4, 2013, during its industry panel at Anime Expo, Sentai Filmworks announced its plans to release a number of classic titles from Tatsunoko Production.  The current list of released titles from the partnership include the original Gatchaman series and movie, Time Bokan: Royal Revival, and Casshan, and more titles followed.

Sunrise announced a licensing deal with Sentai Filmworks that included a number of titles from Sunrise’s library that were formerly licensed by Bandai Entertainment during its Otakon panel on August 8, 2013.

Recent history
In 2014, Sentai opened its in-house localization and recording facility, Sentai Studios.

On June 1, 2015, Sentai made an announcement on its website that Akame ga Kill! had been picked up by Adult Swim for broadcast on its Toonami programming block, almost one week after its announcement at MomoCon 2015. The show began airing on the broadcast night of August 8, 2015, and its premiere night was one of the most watched programs in the block's history with over 1.8 million viewers. Later that year, Parasyte -the maxim-, premiered on October 3. Sentai has promoted the time that the two shows air as "#SentaiHour" on social media. On July 6, 2019, Food Wars!: Shokugeki no Soma began airing on Toonami.

In March 2017, Sentai signed a deal with Amazon to stream the majority of its new licensees exclusively on its Anime Strike channel on Amazon Prime Video in the United States, starting with the Spring 2017 season. After Anime Strike was shuttered in early 2018, all titles previously exclusive to the service were made available to Amazon Prime subscribers in the U.S at no extra charge.

On July 18, 2019, Sentai Filmworks launched a GoFundMe appeal in the wake of the arson attack at Kyoto Animation. With a target of US$750,000, it surpassed the $1 million donation mark within the first 24 hours, and reached $2,370,910 at closing.

On August 1, 2019, Sentai Filmworks' parent company Sentai Holdings, LLC announced that the Cool Japan Fund invested  for shares of the company, stating that "Sentai's independent status makes it a rarity in North America as a licensor of Japanese anime". On September 30, 2020, the Cool Japan Fund made an additional  available, stating that Sentai had achieved better financial results in 2019 compared to 2018, with plans for medium and long-term growth, and strategic changes following the COVID-19 pandemic.

On September 5, 2020, Crunchyroll announced that they had entered in a partnership with Sentai Filmworks to distribute Crunchyroll licensed titles onto home video and electronic sell-through, with Granbelm, Food Wars!: Shokugeki no Soma: The Fourth Plate, Ascendance of a Bookworm, and World Trigger being the first titles distributed through the partnership.

AMC ownership
On January 5, 2022, AMC Networks announced it had acquired Sentai Filmworks' parent company Sentai Holdings, LLC, and all its assets and subsidiaries, including Hidive, Anime Network, and "member interests" from the Cool Japan Fund, via its subsidiary Digital Store LLC.  Prior to the sale, in August 2021, Sony's Funimation Global Group (a joint venture between Sony Pictures Television and Aniplex) acquired Crunchyroll from AT&T's WarnerMedia. This would eventually lead to several Sentai titles departed from the Crunchyroll OTT platform on March 31, 2022.

After Right Stuf was acquired by Sony in August 2022, Sentai announced on March 7, 2023 that all future home releases from them along with Section23 Films will be distributed by Distribution Solutions (DS) from April 3.

Foreign distribution
Sentai Filmworks does not directly release its properties outside of America but instead sub-licenses to other companies. In 2011, MVM Entertainment licensed Mahoromatic: Something More Beautiful after Sentai's re-release of the series, and has done the same with Broken Blade.

In March 2018, it was revealed that Sentai holds distribution rights to the film No Game No Life: Zero that the company gave to the Mexican distributor Madness Entertainment. It was revealed that they directly commissioned a Spanish dubbed version for the film. On March 15, Sentai announced the acquisition of Alice or Alice to Spain and Portugal.

Notable titles

 Akame ga Kill!
 Another
 Appleseed
 Azumanga Daioh
 Carole & Tuesday (home video rights)
 Clannad
 Elfen Lied
 Food Wars!: Shokugeki no Soma
 Girls und Panzer
 Highschool of the Dead
 Is It Wrong to Try to Pick Up Girls in a Dungeon?
 Is the Order a Rabbit?
 K-On!
 Legend of the Galactic Heroes
 Love, Chunibyo & Other Delusions
 Lupin the 3rd Part 6
 Made in Abyss
 Monster Musume
 My Teen Romantic Comedy SNAFU
 Non Non Biyori
 No Game No Life
 Oshi no Ko
 Parasyte -the maxim-
 Princess Tutu
 Shirobako
 Spy Classroom
 The Eminence in Shadow
 To Love Ru
 Urusei Yatsura (2022 series)
 Vinland Saga (home video rights)

Hidive

Hidive, LLC (stylized as HIDIVE) is a subscription video on demand service focused around streaming anime.

After the discontinuation of Anime Network Online in 2017, Hidive LLC, a new company not affiliated with Anime Network, acquired the service's assets and spun them off into a new streaming service called Hidive. Former subscriptions for Anime Network Online were migrated over to Hidive.

Hidive is the exclusive carrier of select licensed titles from Sentai and Section23. Following the closure of Anime Strike, Hidive began streaming titles that were previously exclusive to the former service.

On July 21, 2017, Hidive announced the service would start to offer selected anime titles with Spanish and Portuguese subtitles.

In April 2018, Hidive began offering "Dubcasts" to compete against Funimation's SimulDub program. Similar to SimulDubs, Hidive streams dubs of simulcast titles approximately two to three weeks after the initial Japanese broadcast.

On October 18, 2018, VRV announced that Hidive would be launching a channel on its service. Hidive's channel replaced that of FunimationNow, which left the service on November 9, 2018.

Following Funimation's acquisition of VRV's parent company Crunchyroll on August 9, 2021, Hidive left VRV on September 30 of that year.

See also

Competitors
Crunchyroll, an anime distribution company based in Coppell, formerly known as Funimation
Aniplex of America, a Santa Monica-based anime licensor subsidiary of Aniplex
Discotek Media
Bandai Entertainment, the former distributor
Central Park Media, the defunct anime licensing company
Media Blasters
4Kids Entertainment, the former anime licensor based in New York
Viz Media
Eleven Arts
Shout! Factory
GKIDS

General
List of anime distributed in the United States
List of anime releases made concurrently in the United States and Japan
 A.D. Vision (aka ADV Films)
 Section23 Films

References

External links
 
 

 
2008 establishments in Texas
2022 mergers and acquisitions
AMC Networks
American companies established in 2008
Anime companies
Companies based in Houston
Dubbing (filmmaking)
Home video companies of the United States
Home video distributors
Mass media companies established in 2008
Video production companies